Zenia insignis is a species of legume in the family Fabaceae. It is found in southern China and northern Vietnam. It is threatened by habitat loss and overharvesting. The species is under second-class national protection in China.

References

Further reading
Xiaoyong, He. "Cold Resistance of Zenia insignis from Different Provenances [J]." Scientia Silvae Sinicae 4 (2007).
Lanfang, Tang."Zenia Insignis—A Good Tree Species For Limestone Area [J]." Forestry Science And Technology 3 (1998). 
Xinhong, Liu. "Establishment and Application of Integrated Assessment System on Cold Resistance of Different Zenia insignis Provenances [J]." Scientia Silvae Sinicae 10 (2007).
Fang-ping, T. O. N. G. "Study on the planting technology of valuable and rare growth rapid growing species Zenia insignis Chun [J]." Hunan Forestry Science and Technology 4 (2005).
Xiao-yong, H. E. "The Biological Characteristics of Zenia insignis and Its Exploitation and Utilization [J]." Subtropical Plant Science 1 (2007).
LIU, Xin-hong, and Xiao-yong HE. "Genetic Trait Variation of Zenia insignis ...." Forest Research 6 (2007).

Dialioideae
Trees of China
Trees of Vietnam
Near threatened plants
Taxonomy articles created by Polbot